Daniel Cooley Uggla (born March 11, 1980) is an American former professional baseball second baseman. He played in Major League Baseball (MLB) for the Florida Marlins, Atlanta Braves, San Francisco Giants, and Washington Nationals. In 2010, Uggla won the Silver Slugger Award at second base.

Uggla finished third in the 2006 National League Rookie of the Year voting, behind then-teammate and winner Hanley Ramírez, and future teammate Ryan Zimmerman of the Washington Nationals, but won the Players Choice and Sporting News NL ROY Awards. He is also the only second baseman in MLB history to hit at least 30 home runs in four consecutive seasons.

Personal life
Uggla was born in Louisville, Kentucky, the son of Elizabeth Armistead (née Cooley) and John Carl Uggla. After graduating from Columbia Central High School in Columbia, Tennessee, in 1998, Uggla attended the University of Memphis where he played for the Memphis Tigers. After his junior season, he was named an All-American by Baseball America, Baseball Weekly, and Collegiate Baseball. The surname Uggla is Swedish in origin, one of the most numerous Swedish noble families, and means "Owl".

Uggla married Janette Repsch in December 2013. They have a daughter and a son together. He has two children from a previous marriage.

Professional career

Arizona Diamondbacks
Drafted by the Arizona Diamondbacks in the 11th round (338th overall) of the 2001 Major League Baseball draft, Uggla spent five seasons in the Diamondbacks organization, including a year with the short season-advanced team, the Yakima Bears in Yakima, Washington. He amassed a .276 career minor league batting average, .341 on-base percentage, and .443 slugging percentage, to go along with 64 home runs, 311 runs batted in, and 62 stolen bases. Although he was 25 years old, which would make him the same age as many AAA players, and moderately successful in 2005, he never advanced past the AA level.

Florida Marlins
Uggla was left off the Diamondbacks 40-man roster in 2005, and the Marlins selected him in the Rule 5 draft.

Uggla began the 2006 season with the Marlins and had his first Major League hit just three days later when he singled off Houston Astros pitcher Andy Pettitte. His first home run was on April 13 against San Diego Padres starter Dewon Brazelton, and his first stolen base was a steal of home plate against the Philadelphia Phillies on April 21. Uggla was named to the 2006 Major League Baseball All-Star Game on July 2, 2006, as a reserve; he is the first player in baseball history to be selected for the All-Star Game in the same season in which he had been a Rule 5 pick.

On September 15, 2006, Uggla hit his 25th home run, breaking Joe Gordon's record for most home runs by a rookie second baseman. Because he received less publicity as a prospect than some of his fellow rookies in Major League Baseball, such as Prince Fielder, Ryan Zimmerman, and Nick Markakis, Uggla's display of power in the majors and his selection to the National League All-Star team caused him to suddenly draw more attention. Uggla finished his rookie season with 27 homers and 90 runs batted in. He won numerous rookie awards, including the Players' Choice NL ROY award and Sporting News Rookie of the Year Award.

The Marlins finished Uggla's second season in last place. Uggla finished the year with a .245 batting average, caused mainly by slumps in April and September. However, he did surpass his rookie home run total, hitting 31 home runs and knocking in 88 runs.

On May 10, 2008, Uggla hit his first career grand slam in the fourth inning off of Nationals pitcher Joel Hanrahan. That month, he set a Marlins record for most home runs for a Marlins in any month with 12.

Uggla was named to the 2008 MLB All-Star Game at Yankee Stadium, as well as opting to take part in the 2008 Major League Baseball Home Run Derby. Uggla hit six home runs in the first round of the derby. Uggla finished fifth, tied with Grady Sizemore. In the All-Star Game, Uggla committed two consecutive errors on playable balls in the 10th inning, and a third error in the bottom of the 13th, making him the first player with three errors in a single All-Star Game. Uggla also struck out three times, and grounded into a double play. On September 28, 2008, Uggla hit the last home run ever at Shea Stadium.

During the 2008 offseason, Uggla went to arbitration with the Marlins and was awarded $5.35 million; the Marlins had offered him $4.4 million. On June 5, 2009, Uggla reached 100 career home runs in his 502nd game, faster than any other second baseman.

On January 18, 2010, Uggla signed a one-year, $7.8 million contract with the Marlins. He hit his 144th career home run on July 31, setting the Marlins all-time career mark. On September 13, 2010, he became the first second baseman in Major League history to hit 30 or more home runs in four seasons.

Atlanta Braves
After the 2010 season, Uggla rejected a four-year, $48 million contract offer from the Marlins. Soon thereafter, Uggla was traded to the Atlanta Braves for infielder Omar Infante, and reliever Michael Dunn. On January 4, 2011, Uggla and the Atlanta Braves agreed to a 5-year, $62 million contract.

During the 2011 season with the Braves, Uggla became the 23rd player in MLB history to have a hitting streak of at least 33 games. Uggla, who had gotten off to a poor start, had a .173 batting average after going hitless on July 4. The next day, he collected two hits in four at bats to start the streak. During the hitting streak, Uggla along with rookie Freddie Freeman became the first Braves in the modern era to have concurrent 20-game hitting streaks. On August 12, Uggla hit two home runs in a home game against the Chicago Cubs to break the Atlanta Braves record for longest hitting streak, which had been set by Rico Carty in 1970. He also hit a single and a home run in the next game, extending the streak to 33 games. The streak ended on August 14, 2011, after he went 0-for-3 with a sacrifice fly against the Chicago Cubs.

After the first few weeks, he raised his average over .200. Uggla hit .377 with 15 homers and 32 RBIs during his streak, which was the third-longest by a second baseman in Major League history, and the longest in the majors since 2006.

On August 22, 2011, Uggla hit his 30th home run of the season for his fifth consecutive season of 30 or more home runs. As of the 2011 season, he is the only second baseman to have hit 30 or more home runs in more than three seasons. Uggla was named National League Player of the Month for August; for the month, he was tied for the Major League and led all National Leaguers with 10 home runs. He also had 21 RBI, 33 hits, a .340 (33-for-97) batting average and a .670 slugging percentage with a .405 on-base percentage.

In 2011, Uggla hit a career high 36 home runs. On defense, he tied for the Major League lead in errors by a second baseman, with 15.

In 2012, Uggla performed poorly, with a batting average below .220 through 92 games. His power production was also down, as he hit 12 home runs through 93 games. He also struck out at a rate higher than his previous seasons. His fielding percentage of .980 was equivalent to his poor career fielding percentage. He also, however, drew walks at the highest rate of his career. This actually put his on-base percentage for the 2012 regular season at .348, tied for third best among second basemen with Marco Scutaro of the Giants, behind only Robinson Canó of the Yankees and Aaron Hill of the Diamondbacks.

2013 proved to be a difficult season for Uggla. With 80 hits in 443 plate appearances, batting .179, Uggla had the lowest batting average among qualified MLB batters and tied Rob Deer for the lowest season batting average for a player qualifying for the batting title. On October 1, the Braves announced they would leave Uggla off the 25-man roster during the playoffs.

Uggla had an average beginning to his 2014 season, hitting .237 through his first 16 games, but he really cooled off and hit .114 over his next 12 games, leading the Braves to consider other options at second base. He lost the starting job on May 8 to Ramiro Peña and Tyler Pastornicky, and eventually to Tommy La Stella by the end of May. He was released on July 18, 2014. He batted .162/.241/.231 for Atlanta in 130 at bats.

The Atlanta Braves continued to pay Uggla $19 million through the 2015 season.

San Francisco Giants
On July 21, 2014, Uggla signed a minor league contract with the San Francisco Giants and was called up four days later. He played in four games for the Giants, hitting 0-for-11 and committing two fielding errors. He was designated for assignment on August 1, but rejected his assignment and three days later became a free agent.

Despite only playing four major league games for the Giants, Uggla was given a World Series ring in August 2015, as the Giants had gone on to win the 2014 World Series.

Washington Nationals
On December 26, 2014, Uggla signed a minor league contract with the Washington Nationals, that included an invitation to spring training. He made the opening day roster as second baseman. While Uggla was not a regular fixture in the Nationals' starting lineup, he played a key role in a come-from-behind victory over the Atlanta Braves, his former team, on April 28, 2015. He tripled to drive in two runs and then hit a three-run home run in the ninth to put the Nationals ahead for good. Uggla's last game was October 3, 2015, in which Max Scherzer no-hit the New York Mets in a 2–0 win. Uggla homered in his final at-bat. He batted .183/.298/.300 in 120 at-bats. The Nationals did not renew Uggla's contract at the end of the year, and he subsequently became a free agent.

Records

MLB record
 Five consecutive 30+ HR seasons by a second baseman

Florida / Miami Marlins records
 83 extra-base hits, single season (2007); tied by Hanley Ramírez the same year

See also

 List of Miami Marlins team records
 List of Silver Slugger Award winners at second base
 List of Major League Baseball career home run leaders
 List of Major League Baseball players with a home run in their final major league at bat

References

External links

1980 births
Living people
Florida Marlins players
Atlanta Braves players
San Francisco Giants players
Washington Nationals players
Memphis Tigers baseball players
Yakima Bears players
Lancaster JetHawks players
South Bend Silver Hawks players
El Paso Diablos players
Tennessee Smokies players
Gwinnett Braves players
Fresno Grizzlies players
Baseball players from Louisville, Kentucky
Major League Baseball second basemen
National League All-Stars
People from Columbia, Tennessee
Peoria Javelinas players
Silver Slugger Award winners
American people of Swedish descent